Toci was a deity in the pre-Columbian Mesoamerica. Toci may also refer to
Toçi, an Albanian surname
Crkveni Toci, a village in Serbia
Zabrdnji Toci, a village in Serbia

See also

Tonči